Juan Carlos Blanco Estradé (19 June 1934 – 22 August 2021) was a Uruguayan lawyer and political figure.

Background
Blanco came from a distinguished Uruguayan political family. His father, Daniel Blanco Acevedo, was a Deputy representing Montevideo in the 1940s and 1950s. His grandfather, Juan Carlos Blanco Fernández, was himself Uruguayan Foreign Minister in the 19th Century. His uncle, Juan Carlos Blanco Acevedo, was Foreign Minister in the 1920s.

He was a prominent member of the Colorado Party.

Early career
Blanco qualified as a lawyer.

Subsequently, he worked for many years for the Organization of American States.

Political offices
Blanco was Foreign Minister of Uruguay from 1972 to 1976. His name is closely associated with the civic-military dictatorship, but his beliefs were known to be opposite.

He was Uruguayan Ambassador to the United Nations from 1982 to 1985.

Subsequently, he served in the Senate from 1990 to 1995 and was regarded as being close politically with Jorge Pacheco Areco, a former President of Uruguay.

See also
 Politics of Uruguay
 List of political families

References

1934 births
2021 deaths
University of the Republic (Uruguay) alumni
20th-century Uruguayan lawyers
Foreign ministers of Uruguay
Permanent Representatives of Uruguay to the United Nations
Colorado Party (Uruguay) politicians
Members of the Senate of Uruguay
Civic-military dictatorship of Uruguay
Peruvian politicians convicted of crimes